Vlastimil Tusar (18 October 1880 Prague – 22 March 1924 Berlin) was a Czech journalist and political figure. He served as prime minister of Czechoslovakia from 1919 to 1920, in a two periods.

Tusar was born as the son of a civil servant he attended a gymnasium and an economical school in Prague. Between 1900 and 1903 he worked for a bank, in 1903 he became a journalist for various social democratic papers. In 1908 he became editor in chief of the weekly magazine "Rovnost" in Brno and change it into daily newspaper.

In 1911 he was elected Member of the Austrian Reichsrat (the parliament of the Austro-Hungary) for the constituency of Brno. At first he was pro-Austrian oriented, but later he changed his mind and in 1918 he played a vital role in the formation of Czechoslovakia as new state. On 27 October 1918 from Wien he informed Alois Rašín, that is best moment to declare independence of Czechoslovakia. Then he became a member of the new Czechoslovak parliament, but till 1919 he stayed in Wien as negotiator with new formed Republic of Austria, he negotiate mainly about bordering issues.

8 July 1919 he became prime minister of a new coalition government of Social Democrats and Agrarian party. After parliamentary elections in 1920 he became prime minister again. On 14 August the government resigned because of the rising activity of the communist wing in Social Democracy.

On 1 March 1921 he left his seat in parliament, having been made Czechoslovak ambassador in Berlin, where he died in 1924.

References

External links
 Biography
 Biography on Czech Government page

List of social democrats

1880 births
1924 deaths
Writers from Prague
Politicians from Prague
People from the Kingdom of Bohemia
Czech Social Democratic Party prime ministers
Prime Ministers of Czechoslovakia
Members of the Austrian House of Deputies (1911–1918)
Members of the Revolutionary National Assembly of Czechoslovakia
Members of the Chamber of Deputies of Czechoslovakia (1920–1925)
Ambassadors of Czechoslovakia to Germany